Sakka or Saqqa is a village to the southeast of Damascus, on the edge of the Ghouta,  north west of Damascus International Airport in Syria.

Tell Sakka
Tell Sakka is a man-made tell in the neighborhood that has been excavated by Ahmed Taraqji on behalf of the Directorate-General of Antiquities and Museums.

Remains of a palace was found and dated to between 1800 and 1600 BCE. It has provided evidence of Egyptian influence in the Ghouta, The architectural remains were said to resemble those of Qatna and along with pottery were dated to the Middle Bronze Age. Columns marked the entrance to the south and four large columns were positioned in a square in the centre of the courtyard. Tempera or perhaps Fresco technique Paintings were found on the walls showing ancient Egyptian style and motifs. However, beneath the apparent Egyptian scheme, a Near-Eastern tradition is evident in the ideas of the paintings.

The first cuneiform tablet recovered in the Damascus area was found at Tell Sakka. It was suggested resemble the style of cuneiform found in the archives of Mari and speaks of a king called Zimri-Lim. The cuneiform tablet in Sakka was translated to read "To my brother Zimri-lim, say "Thus saith Kanhilesu? Your brothers Samas and Dagan for the rest of the days, My brother sustenance? In front of me (it is) good. In front of my brother that is well! I heard: The enemy of my country brother, My brother has attacked, news of him that sent me! (...) inside a (?) [..., The army [of my country?], to my brother [(go go)]."

Other finds at the site included a sphinx made out of the scapula of a cow.

References

External links
Sakka on geographic.org
Sakka on maplandia.com
Sakka on mapcarta.com
Sakka on tageo.com
First report of the looting of the Archaeological mission to Tell Sakka on the Facebook page of Le patrimoine archéologique syrien en danger الآثار السورية في خطر, (Syrian Archaeological Heritage under threat)
Photo of Tell Sakka on "Le patrimoine archéologique syrien en danger" Facebook page
Louvre conferences - Tell Sakka, une ville du Bronze Moyen de Damascène (1800-1600), Syrie

Populated places in Douma District
Archaeological sites in Rif Dimashq Governorate
Bronze Age sites in Syria
Tourist attractions in Syria